The Oklahoma Secretary of Human Resources and Administration was a member of the Oklahoma Governor's Cabinet. Prior to its dissolution in 2012, the Secretary was appointed by the Governor of Oklahoma, with the consent of the Oklahoma Senate, to serve at the pleasure of the Governor. The Secretary served as the chief advisor to the Governor on managing the operations and personnel needs of the State government.

The last Secretary of Human Resources and Administration was Oscar B. Jackson Jr., who was appointed by Democratic Governor Brad Henry in 2003 and retained by Republican Governor Mary Fallin in 2011. Previous to his service in this position, he served as Secretary of Human Resources from 1991 to 2003 under Democratic Governor David Walters and Republican Governor Frank Keating.

History
The position of Secretary of Human Resources and Administration was established in 2003 when Governor Brad Henry issued an executive order merging the former positions of Secretary of Human Resources and Secretary of Administration into a single position. Previously, both positions had existed separately since 1986 when they were established by the Executive Branch Reform Act of 1986. In 2011, the Oklahoma Legislature passed the Government Administrative Process Consolidation and Reorganization Act of 2011. This Act consolidated the duties and responsibilities of the Secretary into those of the Oklahoma Secretary of Finance and Revenue, thereby eliminating the position.

Oklahoma state law allows for Cabinet Secretaries to serve concurrently as the head of a State agency in addition to their duties as a Cabinet Secretary. Historically, the Secretary of Human Resources and Administration has also served as the Administrator of the Oklahoma Office of Personnel Management. As of 2010, all Secretaries of Human Resources and Administration have served in that dual position.

Responsibilities
The Secretary of Human Resources and Administration was responsible for providing services to help manage and support the basic functioning of all state agencies. These services included personnel management, central purchasing, state motor pool management, building maintenance and construction, as well as central printing and mailing. The Secretary also oversaw the licensing, supervision and regulation of most professions and occupation that are regulated by the State government.

Agencies overseen
The Secretary of Human Resources and Administration oversees the following state entities:

Accountancy Board
Alternative Fuels Technician Examiners Hearing Board
Architects and Landscape Architects Board
Athletic Trainers Advisory Committee
Board of Licensed Social Workers
Certified Public Manager Advisory Board
Chiropractic Examiners Board
Dentistry Board
Department of Central Services
State Capitol Preservation Commission
Oklahoma Capitol Improvement Authority 
Capitol-Medical Center Improvement and Zoning Commission and Citizens Advisory Committee
State Use Committee
Public Employees Relations Board
Dietetic Registration Advisory Committee
Electrologists Advisory Committee
Embalmers and Funeral Directors Board
Engineers and Land Surveyors, Board of Registration
Horse Racing Commission
Human Rights Commission
Medical Licensure and Supervision Board
Merit Protection Commission
Motor Vehicle Commission
Nurse Anesthetist Formulary Advisory Council
Nurse Formulary Advisory Council
Nursing Board and Advisory Council
Occupational Therapy Advisory Committee

Office of Personnel Management
Affirmative Action Review Council
Governor’s Advisory Council on Asian-American Affairs
Governor’s Advisory Council on Latin American and Hispanic Affairs
Governor's Ethnic American Advisory Council 
Committee for Incentive Awards for State Employees
Mentor Selection Advisory Committee
Oversight Committee for State Employee Charitable Contributions
Employee Assistance Program Advisory Council 
Oklahoma Commission on the Status of Women
Optometry Examiners Board
Osteopathic Examiners Board
Perfusionists Board of Examiners
Pharmacy Board
Physical Therapy Committee
Physician’s Assistant Advisory Committee
Podiatric Medical Examiners Board
Psychologist Board of Examiners
Real Estate Appraiser Board
Real Estate Commission
Respiratory Care Advisory Committee
Sanitarian Registration Advisory Council
Savings & Loan Advisory Council
Speech Pathology and Audiology Board of Examiners
State Board of Cosmetology
State Employee Child Day Care Advisory Committee
State Employees Benefits Council
State/Education Employees Group Insurance Board
Used Motor Vehicle & Parts Commission
Veterinary Medical Examiners Board

Salary
The annual salary of the Secretary of Human Resources and Administration was set by law at $75,000.

List of Secretaries

Secretary of Human Resources (1986–2003)

Secretary of Administration (1986–2003)

Secretary of Human Resources and Administration (2003–2012)

References

External links
 Members of the Governor's Cabinet
 State biography of Cabinet Secretary Oscar Jackson

Human Resources and Administration
Human Resources and Administration